Hustopeče is a town in Břeclav District in the South Moravian Region of the Czech Republic. It has about 6,000 inhabitants. It is known for fruit and wine growing.

Etymology
The name of the town is derived from the name of the nobleman and alleged founder of Hustopeče, named Úsopek.

Geography

The town lies in the warmest part of the country. The northern part of Hustopeče is situated within the southern foothills of the Ždánice Forest range, and the southern part of Hustopeče lies in the Lower Morava Valley lowland.

History

The first written mention of Hustopeče is from 1247. In the 13th century, the area was settled by German colonizators, who brought viticulture here. The German name of Hustopeče Auspitz was first documented in 1279.

From the beginning of the 14th century until 1599, Hustopeče was owned by the Cistercian abbey in Brno. The advantageous location on the border of three countries made Hustopeče an important economic centre with markets. In 1572, Emperor Maximilian II promoted Hustopeče to a town. From 1599 to 1848, Hustopeče was property of the House of Liechtenstein.

In 1531, Anabaptists led by Jakob Hutter came into the town from Tyrol and Carinthia, and founded a Hutterite community. Hustopeče became the centre of Moravian Anabaptists.

Hustopeče was badly damaged during the Thirty Years' War During this period, the acreage of vineyards fell to 10% of its original state. However, winemaking gradually recovered, and in the mid-18th century, Hustopeče was the largest wine-growing municipality in Moravia. In 1726, the winemaking guild was established.

In 1756, the Piarists established a first gymnasium here. On 18 July 1894, Hustopeče received access to a Lokalbahn branch line to Šakvice and the Emperor Ferdinand Northern Railway from Vienna to Prague. Until 1918, Auspitz – Hustopeče was part of the Austrian monarchy (Austrian side after the Compromise of 1867), in the district with the same name, one of the 34 Bezirkshauptmannschaften in the Cisleithanian Margraviate of Moravia. According to the 1910 census, most of its inhabitants were ethnic Germans.

After World War I and the dissolution of Austria-Hungary, large parts of the South Moravian region were claimed by the newly established Republic of German-Austria; nevertheless, according to the 1919 Treaty of Saint-Germain, Hustopeče and it surroundings passed the First Czechoslovak Republic. After the Munich Agreement in 1938, it was occupied by Nazi Germany and incorporated into Reichsgau Niederdonau as one of the municipalities in Sudetenland. After World War II, Hustopeče returned to Czechoslovakia and the remaining German-speaking population was expelled according to the Beneš decrees.

Demographics

Economy

Hustopeče is known for viticulture and also for almond growing, which is unique in Central Europe.

Transport
The D2 motorway from Brno to the border with Slovakia runs through the town.

Sport
Each year, Hustopeče is host to the world's best high jumpers competing in the Moravia High Jump Tour.

Sights

The main landmark is the Gothic parish Church of Saints Wenceslaus and Agnes of Bohemia. The original Church of St. Wenceslaus was built in the early 14th century. Though renovated several times, its steeple collapsed in 1961 and damaged the church's structure greatly. Despite efforts to preserve the valuable remaining part, it was decided to demolish the entire building. The new modern church was built on the site of the old one in 1994 and consecrated to Saints Wenceslaus and Agnes of Bohemia.

The second landmark of the town square is the town hall. The Neorenaissance building comes from 1906.

Notable people
Tomáš Garrigue Masaryk (1850–1937), politician, the first president of Czechoslovakia; lived here in 1861–1868
Josef Šural (1990–2019), footballer
Michal Sáček (born 1996), footballer

Twin towns – sister cities

Hustopeče is twinned with:
 Benátky nad Jizerou, Czech Republic
 Miedźna, Poland
 Modra, Slovakia

References

External links

Hustopečsko Municipal Association 

Cities and towns in the Czech Republic
Shtetls
Populated places in Břeclav District